The fourteenth cycle of America's Next Top Model premiered on March 10, 2010, and it is the eighth season to be aired on The CW. The first three seasons of America's Next Top Model were filmed in New York City, along with seasons 10,12, and 14. The cycle's catchphrase is "Work It Out". The promotional songs are "Watch Me Move" by Fefe Dobson and "Go Getta" by Stella Mwangi.

The prizes for this cycle were:

 A modeling contract with Wilhelmina Models.
 A fashion spread and cover in Seventeen.
 A 100,000 contract with CoverGirl cosmetics.

J. Alexander was removed from his post as a judge and replaced by Vogue editor André Leon Talley. Though Alexander was removed as judge, he remained as runway coach. The international destinations during this cycle were Auckland and Queenstown, New Zealand. This is the show’s second consecutive visit to Polynesia after Maui, Hawaii in cycle 13.

The winner was 24-year-old Krista White from Pine Bluff, Arkansas with Raina Hein placing as the runner up.

Season summary
A new rule for this cycle was that the first contestant called on the judging panel every week would get to have their picture (or commercial) displayed as digital art in the models' house and to receive the prize of the following week's reward challenge, regardless of their performance in the challenge. If the same girl won the challenge, she was able to pick others to join her on the reward or received additional prizes along with her challenge win.

Top Models in Action was replaced with Top Model Lounge: a segment featuring two past contestants Bianca Golden from cycle 9 and Laura Kirkpatrick from cycle 13 offering commentary about each week's episode. Golden and Kirkpatrick returned a year and a half later for the All Stars cycle along with this cycle's Angelea Preston and eleven other alumnae who had not won.

This cycle returned to featuring girls within the standard heights of the modeling industry ( and taller), unlike the previous cycle ( and under). In addition, cycle 14 was filmed in New York City and did not return until cycle 23.

Contestants
(Ages stated are at start of contest)

Episodes

Summaries

Call-out order

 The contestant was not included in the casting call-out order but was additionally added to the cast
 The contestant was eliminated
 The contestant won the competition

Bottom two

 The contestant was eliminated after their first time in the bottom two
 The contestant was eliminated after their second time in the bottom two
 The contestant was eliminated after their third time in the bottom two
 The contestant was eliminated in the final judging and placed as the runner-up

Average call-out order
Casting call-out order and final two are not included.

Photo Shoot Guide

 Episode 1 photo shoot: Embodying famous models (casting)
 Episode 2 photo shoot was split into parts:
 First part: Nude with Custo Barcelona items
 Second part: Perfume beauty shots with the New York City skyline
 Episode 3 photo shoot: Dance genres
 Episode 4 photo shoot: Vampires in a bloody bathtub
 Episode 5 photo shoot: Faux fashion on Canal Street
 Episode 6 photo shoot: CoverGirl smoky shadow blast portraying New York women on a moving train
 Episode 7 photo shoot: Posing with hair dresses
 Episode 8 photo shoot: Posing in couture dresses with a sheep on a mountain
 Episode 9 photo shoot: Beauty shots with shadows
 Episode 10 photo shoot: Era-descent couture
 Episode 11 photo shoot and commercial: CoverGirl Blast collection, Seventeen magazine cover

Makeovers
 Gabrielle - Volumized curls and dyed strawberry blonde
 Naduah - Eyebrows bleached
 Ren - Cut to chin-length and underarms shaved
 Simone - Cut short and shaved on one side a la Cassie Ventura
 Tatianna - Dyed golden blonde
 Brenda - Halle Berry inspired pixie cut; later, shaved on the sides
 Anslee - Cut short and dyed blonde
 Alasia - Wild curly clip-in extensions
 Jessica - Straightened and dyed chocolate brown
 Alexandra - Gisele Bundchen inspired blonde highlights
 Angelea - Long golden blonde weave with bangs; later, weave removed
 Raina - Dyed dark chocolate brown
 Krista - Slicked back with clip-in ponytail

Post-Top Model careers
Brenda Arens is currently signed with Page.713 in Houston, Page Parkes Agency and Campbell Agency. Since the show, she has taken a few test shots, appeared in Seventeen Magazine, and has modeled for Rachel Roy. She used to be signed with the Campbell's Soup in Dallas and Flash Model Management in Milan.
Alasia Ballard has done a wedding dress test shoot, been featured in Delux Magazine and is currently signed to Holmes Lewis Models.
Raina Hein is currently signed with Wilhelmina Models in Miami, Major Models in Paris, PhotoGenics in Los Angeles, LOOK Model Agency in San Francisco, Moore Creative Talent in Minneapolis, Ignite Models in Dallas, and Wehmann Models & Talent in Minneapolis. Since the show, she has taken various test shots, booked a campaign for Symphony Retailers in Dubai, appeared in Seventeen Magazine, Metro Magazine, Grazia Magazine, and appeared in Arabia's and Hong Kong's Harper's Bazaar. She walked in Dubai Fashion Week for Vera Wang. She also became the face of Furne One perfume for Bench and modeled with the collection in the Philippines. She has also done a campaign in The NeuHair and had a cover on the SU magazine 2013 issue. She is also a star in an independent feature film To Say Goodbye.
Tatianna Kern has modeled for Marlowe Holt.
Gabrielle Kniery is currently signed with Fenton Moon Models in New York City and Centro Models and has modeled for KAS couture, Alive magazine, Do You Social Magazine, Gigi Designs, Scholarship clothing, Delux Magazine, and ID models. She also modeled for Remrod and Tuan Lee Photography. She also appeared as a pageant contestant in the music video for "Pretty Hurts" by Beyonce
Simone Lewis is currently signed with Exposure Model and Talent Agency and has taken a few test shots. Since the show, she has modeled for Bluefly and Gigi Designs.
Anslee Payne-Franklin has modeled for Freeze Frame Studios and has done some test shots.
Angelea Preston has taken a few test shots. She has walked in New York Fashion Week for the Sachika twins and Richie Rich. She has starred in a commercial for Keratin Earth. Angelea has also been on the cover of Fashionista magazine. She is currently signed with Colby Models in New York City. Additionally, she participated on America's Next Top Model: All Stars, among other past competitors, and was disqualified in the finale finishing 3rd, before revealing later that she had actually been the original winner of the competition prior to her disqualification. Angelea has confirmed via Twitter that she is pregnant and is now married.
Naduah Rugely has done a variety of test shots, print ads, and runway.
Jessica Serfaty is currently signed with NEXT Model Management in Los Angeles and New York, Abrams Artists Agency in Los Angeles, Wunder Management and MDI Model Management in Korea. Since the show, she has appeared in Seventeen Magazine, booked a campaign with Papaya clothing and has been mainly focused on acting. She has appeared in commercials for McDonald's, Doritos, Toyota, and more. She's been busy going to auditions for TV shows, movies, and commercials. She can be seen in the music video "Justify Sex" by Dan Balan and "Highway Don't Care" by Tim McGraw and Taylor Swift.  She is currently playing the character of Sloan Petersen on the NBC soap opera Days of our Lives.
Alexandra Underwood is currently signed with Wilhelmina Models in New York City and Models 1 in London. Since the show, she has taken a few test shots, and appeared on the cover of Plus Sized Magazine. She has walked in New York Fashion Week for the Sachika Twins.
Ren Vokes has taken a few test shots. Since the show, she has modeled for Odyline and The Hundreds. She used to be signed with the Kim Dawson Agency in Dallas.
Krista White has collected all her prizes and is currently signed with Wilhelmina Models in New York City. Since the show, she has taken a few test shots, she has appeared on the cover and had a spread in Seventeen Magazine, had a cover of FantasticMag, and a spread in Fiasco Magazine, and she has booked a back-to-school campaign for Max Rave. Krista has walked for several designers like Nicole Miller and Huffer in New Zealand Fashion Week as part of her prize for winning a runway challenge while on a plane in New Zealand. Krista has also modeled for top designer Betsey Johnson and friend Sergio Guadarramo's collection "Celestino Collection". In 2011, she walked the runway for BET's Rip The Runway.

Cast members

J. Alexander – runway coach
Jay Manuel – photo shoot director

Notes

References

External links
Official website

2010 American television seasons
A14
Television shows filmed in New York City
Television shows filmed in New Zealand